Aisea Natoga (born 5 September 1990) is a Fijian rugby union player who played for Ospreys as a winger. He is a Fijian international.

Natoga made his debut for the Ospreys in 2013 having previously played for Aberavon RFC and Neath RFC.

References

External links 
Ospreys Player Profile

Fijian rugby union players
Ospreys (rugby union) players
Living people
1990 births
Fiji international rugby union players
Fijian Drua players
US Carcassonne players
Rugby union wings